The Season of Love (also known as Christmas: The Season of Love) is a Christmas album, as well as the fourth studio album, of the contemporary Christian group 4Him. It was released on Benson Records on October 1, 1993.

Due to its original success among 4Him's works, the album was re-issued on September 30, 1996, with a new album cover and art.

Track listing

 All vocal arrangements by Don Koch and 4Him except "The Little Drummer Boy" by Bill Baumgart.

Personnel 
 Numbers in parenthesis symbolize track numbers.
4Him
 Andy Chrisman – lead vocals (2–5, 7, 9), backing vocals
 Mark Harris – lead vocals (2, 4, 5, 10), backing vocals
 Marty Magehee – lead vocals (5, 6, 8, 9), backing vocals
 Kirk Sullivan – lead vocals (1, 5, 9), backing vocals

Musicians
 Don Koch – rhythm arrangements (1, 4), keyboards (1), additional keyboards (2, 4, 5, 8, 9), programming (6), track arrangements (6, 7), acoustic piano (10)
 Blair Masters – Hammond B3 organ (1), programming (4, 7), keyboards (7)
 David Huntsinger – keyboards (2, 5, 8, 9)
 Bill Baumgart – programming (3)
 Jerry McPherson – guitar (1)
 Dennis Dearing – guitar (1)
 Mark Baldwin – guitar (2, 5, 6, 8, 9)
 Michael Hodge – guitar (4, 7), guitar solo (8, 9)
 Jackie Street – bass (1)
 Craig Nelson – bass (2, 5, 8, 9)
 John Hammond – drums (1)
 Mark Hammond – drums (2, 5, 8, 9)
 Mark Douthit – saxophones (1), sax solo (4)
 Sam Levine – sax solo (5)
 Barry Green – trombone (1, 4, 6)
 Chris McDonald – trombone (1, 4, 6), brass arrangements (1, 4, 6)
 Jeff Bailey – trumpet (1, 4, 6)
 Mike Haynes – trumpet (1, 4, 6)

The Nashville String Machine (Tracks 2, 4, 5, 6, 8, 9 & 10)
 Ralph Carmichael – orchestral arrangements (2, 5, 8, 9), string arrangements (4, 6, 10)
 David Angell, David Davidson, Paul Brantley, John Catchings, Ernie Collins, Chris Dunn, Conni Ellisor, Barry Green, Carl Gorodetzky, Jim Grosjean, Anthony LaMarchina, Lee Larrison, Ted Madsen, Bob Mason, Tom McAninch, Chris McDonald, Laura Molyneaux, Leslie Norton, Randall Olson, Monisa Phillips, Eberhard Ramm, Pamela Sixfin, Bobby Taylor, Alan Umstead, Catherine Umstead, Gary Vanosdale, Mary Kathryn Vanosdale, Kristin Wilkinson and Joy Worland – orchestra and string performers

Choir on "Do You Hear What I Hear"
 Bill Baumgart, Chris Willis, Mark Ivey, Angelo and Veronica Petrucci, Rick Elias and Linda Elias

Production 
 Don Koch – producer 
 Ralph Carmichael – co-producer (2, 5, 8, 9)
 Andy Ivey – executive producer
 Bill Deaton – engineer
 Tom Laune – engineer
 Lynn Fuston – engineer
 Keith Compton – engineer
 Bill Baumgart – engineer
 David Murphy – engineer
 Bret Teegarden – engineer
 Brent King – engineer
 The Bennett House, Franklin, Tennessee – recording location
 Quad Studios, Nashville, Tennessee – recording location
 Sound Revolutions, Nashville, Tennessee – recording location
 Classic Recording, Nashville, Tennessee – recording location
 Skylab Studios, Nashville, Tennessee – recording location
 Great Circle Sound, Nashville, Tennessee – recording location
 Omni Sound Studios, Nashville, Tennessee – recording location
 John Jaszcz – mixing at Omni Sound Studios
 Patrick Kelly – mix assistant
 Aaron Swihart – mix assistant 
 Ken Love – mastering at MasterMix (Nashville, Tennessee)
 Mike Murray – production assistant
 Mark Quattrochi – production assistant
 Mark Tucker – photography
 Connie Harrington – art direction
 June Arnold – grooming
 Claudia McConnell Fowler – hair stylist

1996 re-issue cover
 Matt Barnes – photography
 Patrick Pollei – design
 Randall Lockridge – design
 Mike Rapp – art direction
 Jamie Kearney – wardrobe
 Melanie Shelley – stylist

References

1993 albums
1993 Christmas albums
4Him albums
Christmas albums by American artists